Fale may refer to:


People
 Anatólio Falé (1913–1980), Portuguese professor of music, musician and composer
 Bad Luck Fale (born 1982), Tongan-New Zealand professional wrestler
 Carlos Falé (born 1933), Portuguese former footballer
 Richard Fale (born 1981), American politician
 Thomas Fale, English mathematician
 Tualau Fale (born 1960), Tongan boxer
 Fale Burman (1903–1973), Swedish Army lieutenant general
 Fale, a clan or subgroup of the Matbat ethnic group - see List of ethnic groups of West Papua

Other uses
 Fale, a house or building in the architecture of Samoa and Polynesia more broadly
 Beach fale, beach hut in Samoa
 Fale, Tokelau, an islet and a village of Tokelau
 Fale, Tuvalu, an islet of Tuvalu
 FALE, the ICAO code for King Shaka International Airport in Durban, South Africa

See also 
 Fail (disambiguation)
 Fales, a surname